Oleggio is an comune  in the Province of Novara in the Italian region Piedmont.

Oleggio may also refer to:

 Oleggio Castello, comune in the Province of Novara in the Italian region of Piedmont
 Oleggio Magic Basket, basketball team in Oleggio, Italy
 Luino–Oleggio railway, a railway line in Lombardy, Italy